Wolftrap Mountain is a mountain in counties Laois and Offaly, Ireland. The mountain is 487 metres (1,598 ft) high, making it the third-highest summit in Offaly, the fourth-highest mountain in the Slieve Bloom Mountains and the 602th-highest summit in Ireland. It is the most northerly summit of the Slieve Bloom range.

See also
List of mountains in Ireland

References

 Mountains and hills of County Offaly
 Mountains and hills of County Laois